Abu Tha'alba, was one of the companions of Muhammad and narrator of hadith, quoted in Sahih Bukhari, the most prominent source of Hadith among Sunni Muslims.

See also
Islam

References

Year of birth missing
Year of death missing
Sahabah hadith narrators